d.p.c. (Latin, short for days post coitum or dies post coitum, meaning days after sex) is a term commonly used in medicine and biology to refer to the age of an embryo.

See also
 Embryology
 Developmental biology
 List of Latin phrases

Embryology